Parkway West High School is a public magnet high school located in the Mill Creek neighborhood of Philadelphia, Pennsylvania. It shares a site with the Middle Years Alternative School for the Humanities (MYA). Both schools are part of the School District of Philadelphia.

The schools are located in the former Mayer Sulzberger Junior High School building. It was designed by Irwin T. Catharine and built in 1923–1924. It is a three-story, 17 bay, brick building on a raised stone basement in the Colonial Revival-style. It is in the shape of a shallow "W". It features a center projecting pavilion, brick pilasters with stone caps, stone cornice, and a brick parapet. The building was added to the National Register of Historic Places in 1988.

In 2008, the school district voted to close the Sulzberger Middle School due to declining enrollment. Additionally, Parkway West and MYA were moved from an older, deteriorating building to the Sulzberger building. Both schools were moved in by 2009.

History

Parkway West began in 1970 as the Gamma Campus of the Parkway Program which was a school without walls program. Parkway Gamma was located at 3833 Walnut Street in the University City section of West Philadelphia. In the early 2000s, Parkway Gamma changed its name to Parkway West and relocated to the former West Philadelphia Catholic High School for Boys located at 49th and Chestnut Streets in West Philadelphia also. They had shared the facilities with MYA until relocating to their current location.

References

External links
Parkway West High School
Middle Years Alternative School for the Humanities

School buildings on the National Register of Historic Places in Philadelphia
Colonial Revival architecture in Pennsylvania
School buildings completed in 1924
School District of Philadelphia
Public middle schools in Pennsylvania
Public high schools in Pennsylvania
1924 establishments in Pennsylvania